Nico Sturm (born May 3, 1995) is a German professional ice hockey forward for the San Jose Sharks of the National Hockey League (NHL). Sturm won the Stanley Cup with the Colorado Avalanche in 2022.

Playing career

Amateur
Sturm played as a youth in his native Germany, appearing with ESV Kaufbeuren in the German Development League (DNL) from 2011 to 2014. In order to continue his development, Sturm opted to move to North America, playing in the North American Hockey League with the Corpus Christi IceRays and the Austin Bruins.

Sturm was selected by the Tri-City Storm, 72nd overall, in the 2015 USHL Entry Draft. On June 30, 2015, Sturm was announced to have signed with the Storm, while also committing to play collegiate hockey at Clarkson University of the ECAC.

In the 2015–16 season, Sturm recorded 39 points in 57 games with the Tri-City Storm and added 6 points in 5 playoff games to help Tri-City win the Clark Cup.

Sturm played his freshman season with the Clarkson University Golden Knights in the 2016–17 season, collecting 21 points in 38 games to earn a selection to the ECAC All-Rookie Team. In his second year, Sturm continued to realise his potential, increasing his offensive production with 37 points in 40 games. His solid two-way play was noticed as he led the NCAA with a 61.7% face-off win percentage and was named the 2017–18 ECAC Best Defensive Forward.

Returning as co-captain for his junior season with Clarkson in 2018–19, Sturm led the team in scoring and assists with 45 points in 39 games. In his standout season for the top ranked Golden Knights, he was named the ECAC Hockey Best Defensive Forward for the second consecutive season, a Top Ten Hobey Baker Award Finalist, a finalist for the ECAC Hockey Player of the Year Award, named to the 2019 ECAC Hockey All-Tournament Team and an ECAC First-Team All-League selection.

Professional

Minnesota Wild
As an undrafted free agent, Sturm attracted league wide NHL interest following his junior season, opting to forgo his senior year in signing a one-year, entry-level contract for the remainder of the 2018–19 season, with the Minnesota Wild on April 1, 2019. He immediately joined the out of contention Wild making his NHL debut in a 3–0 defeat to the Boston Bruins on April 4, 2019.

Sturm mostly played in the Wild's American Hockey League (AHL) affiliate, the Iowa Wild, in the 2019–20 season. He earned a call-up to the NHL during the season and recorded his first two NHL assists in a six-game stint with the Wild. When the season was suspended due to the COVID-19 pandemic, the Wild were admitted to a play-in round of the playoffs when the NHL resumed. Sturm would play in two games of the Wild's five-game series against the Vancouver Canucks, and scored his first NHL goal in Game 4 against Jacob Markström.

Colorado Avalanche
On March 15, 2022, he was traded by the Wild to Division rivals, the Colorado Avalanche, in exchange for Tyson Jost. On June 26, 2022, Sturm helped the Avalanche claim their first Stanley Cup in 21 years.

San Jose Sharks
On the back of his success with the Avalanche, Sturm as a free agent was signed to a three-year, $6 million contract with the San Jose Sharks on July 13, 2022.

Personal
Sturm is in a relationship with fellow Clarkson alum and professional hockey player Taylor Turnquist.

Career statistics

Regular season and playoffs

International

Awards and honors

References

External links

1995 births
Living people
AHCA Division I men's ice hockey All-Americans
Clarkson Golden Knights men's ice hockey players
Colorado Avalanche players
German ice hockey centres
Iowa Wild players
Minnesota Wild players
San Jose Sharks players
Sportspeople from Augsburg
Stanley Cup champions
Tri-City Storm players
Undrafted National Hockey League players
German expatriate ice hockey people
German expatriate sportspeople in the United States